2887 may refer to:

 2887 (number)
 U+2887, unicode for Braille pattern dots-1238
 Farm to Market Road 2887 in Runnels County, Texas
 2887 Krinov, asteroid in the Flora mamily of the asteroid belt